Mark Schanowski is an American sportscaster. Schanowski currently works for NBC Sports Chicago, appearing in the Chicago Bulls' pre- and post-game shows as well as the SportsNite program. He is also the per diem sports anchor and reporter for WLS-TV. Schanowski had worked as a sports anchor at WMAQ-TV until 2005. On May 20, 2021, Schanowski will join WLS-TV starting May 29, 2021 as a per diem sports anchor and reporter for the station. On May 29, 2021, Schanowski made his debut appearance on WLS-TV during the 5pm news. He is co-host of the "Gimme the Hot Sauce" podcast with Stacey King and Tim Kelley.

References

Television sports anchors from Chicago
American sports announcers
Year of birth missing (living people)
Living people
Chicago Bulls announcers
National Basketball Association broadcasters